The 64th session of the Utah State Legislature sat from 2021 to 2022. House members were elected at the 2020 Utah House of Representatives election. Fifteen  Senate members were elected at the 2020 Utah Senate election.

Composition of the House of Representatives

Leadership in the House

Members of the 64th House of Representatives

 * Representative was originally appointed to office.
 †Travis Seegmiller  announced his resignation from office, effective July 1, 2022.

Composition of the Senate

Leadership, 64th session

Members of the 64th Senate

↑: Senator was originally appointed

References

See also 

 List of Utah state legislatures

Utah legislative sessions
2021 in Utah